Ábrahámhegy is a village in Veszprém county, Hungary. It is located on the shore of Lake Balaton.

References

External links
 Street map (Hungarian)

Populated places in Veszprém County